The 1914 Grand Prix season consisted of Grand Prix races across Europe and the United States until abbreviated by the outbreak of World War I.

The Vanderbilt Cup and the American Grand Prize were held again after a year’s abeyance, this time raced at Santa Monica, California. European cars arrived in force to contest the Indianapolis 500. French cars dominated the race taking the top four places with victory going to René Thomas in a Delage. The unofficial AAA national championship would be awarded to Ralph DePalma.

The French Grand Prix was in Lyon, this time with a maximum engine size of 4.5-litres. Held in the shadow of political crisis in Europe, it was hailed as the greatest race to date, after an epic battle between the Peugeot and Mercedes. After Georges Boillot had engine problems on the last lap, it left the German team with a dominating 1-2-3 finish, led by Christian Lautenschlager who had won the race before, in 1908.

It proved to be the last major race before war overtook Europe in August 1914.

Major Races 
Sources:

Regulations and Technical
The three main American races all ran to different regulations: the Vanderbilt Cup’s engine limits were 301 – 600 cu in, Indianapolis had a maximum engine size of 450 cu in, while the Grand Prize had an open formula.

Hoping to minimise the impact of the big-engined cars of foreign manufacturers, the ACF changed its regulations again for the first time to impose a maximum engine size – of 4.5-litres, along with an allowable weight range of 800-1100kg (excluding fluids and tools). This tended to favour those companies that had invested in voiturette racing, Peugeot, Delage and Sunbeam. There was also an entry limit of five cars per manufacturer.

For this, Peugeot unveiled its new EX-5 from Ernest Henry, with a twin-overhead cam 4.5-litre four-cylinder engine. Both the Delages and Peugeots had four-wheel brakes for the first time, along with FIAT. In response, the Mercedes 18/100 GP, designed by Paul Daimler, developed 115 bhp. The 4.5-litre engine had four valves per cylinder and a single overhead camshaft. Gone was the chain-drive, instead a lighter live rear-axle was used. However, they did persist with rear brakes only. Despite a better top-end speed from the Peugeot’s streamlined rear-end, the Mercedes’ lower centre-of-gravity and better road-holding gave it an edge over the French cars.

Season review
The Vanderbilt Cup and American Grand Prize were revived this year and once again held as a combined meeting, this time on an 8-mile road circuit at Santa Monica, California. The press touted the Cup as a grudge match between rivals Ralph DePalma and Barney Oldfield. DePalma had walked out from his role as team leader at Mercer when they hired Oldfield without asking him first. DePalma retrieved the Mercedes with which he had won the 1912 race. From the start Oldfield’s teammate Eddie Pullen took the lead until he lost a wheel. Then Oldfield and DePalma ran wheel to wheel until DePalma sold a dummy on stopping for a tyre change. Oldfield took the bait and pitted, allowing the older Mercedes to race onto victory.

Two days later, 250000 spectators and most of the same cars returned for the Grand Prize. Spencer Wishart led in his Mercer for most of the first half of the race until stopped by engine problems. DePalma took over but this time his engine gave out as well. Pullen got to the front and carried on to win – his Mercer being the first American car to win the Grand Prize delighting the crowd.

After Peugeot’s success at Indianapolis in 1913, more European teams returned for the 1914 race and the race promised to be a great showdown between the best drivers from both sides of the Atlantic with most of the best teams present. Peugeot sent its new EX-5 with regular team drivers Georges Boillot and Jules Goux (returning 1913 winner) along with a 3-litre EX-3 for Belgian Arthur Duray. Delage sent its 7.0-litre Type Y for René Thomas and Albert Guyot. Peugeot engineer Ettore Bugatti had Ernest Friderich in one of his own cars. As well as an Italian Isotta Fraschini and a Belgian Excelsior, Ralph Mulford returned with his Mercedes. Sunbeam came from England with Jean Chassagne and another car for Harry Grant. The American teams from Mercer, Stutz and Mason entered, with much the same driver line-ups from Santa Monica. Barney Oldfield however had switched to Stutz. Inaugural winner Ray Harroun designed the Maxwell car for Teddy Tetzlaff and Billy Carlson.

Boillot was the fastest in the elimination trials, setting a lap record of 99.9 mph. Second was team-mate Goux with Tetzlaff third. In a big surprise, Ralph DePalma failed to qualify in his privateer Mercedes. In the random draw it was Chassagne’s Sunbeam that got the pole position, while Boillot got the second-to-last position of the 30 qualifiers.

The three Peugeots soon got to the front and were setting the pace until thwarted by tyre problems. One delaminated on Boillot’s car spinning him off the track and Goux lost time with a number of stops. On lap 42 Ray Gilhooley crashed his Isotta on the back straight. As his mechanic was escaping the wreck Joe Dawson had to take drastic avoiding action and rolled his Marmon in an accident that ended his career. In the end it was dominant victory for René Thomas and Delage, who led for over half the race winning with over a 6-minute, four-lap margin from Arthur Duray in the 3-litre Peugeot. Thomas’ teammate Guyot was third with Goux coming in fourth. First American home was Barney Oldfield, fifth in the Stutz.

After another dozen rounds at eight other circuits, the AAA national championship would be unofficially awarded to Ralph DePalma. On 4th July at the Sioux City race, Eddie Rickenbacker had scored the first victory for Fred Duesenberg’s new team (formerly Mason). Sadly, top driver Spencer Wishart, second at the previous year’s Indianapolis race, was killed when his Mercer crashed during the Elgin Trophy races.

Two other racing events returned, both last held in 1908. The Coppa Florio was won that year by Felice Nazzaro in a FIAT. This time it ran over three laps on the Madonie course in Sicily. It was won again by Nazzaro, this time in his own car repeating his triumph from the 1913 Targa Florio. Second was Ernesto Ceirano in his company’s SCAT. Six weeks later the Targa Florio again ran as the Giro di Sicilia around the coastal roads of Sicily. A two-day event, this time it stopped overnight in Syracuse. Ceirano won in 17 hours, at a record speed of 62 km/h and a comfortable 2-hour margin.

Similarly, the RAC Tourist Trophy was held after a hiatus of six years. Raced on the Isle of Man, it was staged over two days with eight laps on each day, and for the first time offered a cash prize – the considerable sum of £1000. Kenelm Lee Guinness, of the famous brewing family, won in a 3.4-litre Sunbeam from a pair of Belgian Minervas.

On 28 June, the heir to the Austro-Hungarian empire was assassinated in Sarajevo. By co-incidence, one of the royal chauffeurs was former Mercedes works-driver Otto Merz. A week later, the French Grand Prix was held under an increasingly tense political situation across Europe. The city of Lyon promised large subsidies and the race was held on a 38 km road circuit to the south of the city. It ran from Les Ronzières to Givors, then along the bank of the Gier (a tributary of the Rhône) to Châteauneuf before taking an undulating 15km straight back to a steep downhill right-left and a hairpin to complete the lap.

The race attracted a high-quality field of 37 starters from 13 manufacturers. Peugeot were the favourites to repeat their victories in 1912 and 1913. They arrived with three of their new L-45 cars for Boillot, Goux and Victor Rigal. Louis Delâge bought the new 5-speed Type S for Guyot, Duray and Paul Bablot. New French company Alva convinced Ferenc Szisz, winner of the inaugural Grand Prix in 1906, out of retirement to lead their team.
Their most serious opposition to the French teams would come from Mercedes, returning to the Grand Prix for the first time since winning in 1908. Five of the six 18/100 cars built were entered with a strong team of drivers led by Christian Lautenschlager, victor in 1908, along with Otto Salzer, Mercedes director Max Sailer, French veteran Louis Wagner and Belgian agent Théodore Pilette. In January, as part of its meticulous preparation, Mercedes had sent its team to France to go over the track. Opel arrived with the lightest cars in the field, well over 100kg lighter than most others. Carl Jörns led a team of three cars. From Italy came FIAT (including veteran Alessandro Cagno), Felice Nazzaro’s own team and a single entry from Aquila Italiana. Great Britain was represented by Sunbeam (Resta, Lee Guinness and Chassagne) and Vauxhall who included American Ralph DePalma in their squad.

Race-day was hot and fine, and about 300,000 spectators lined the roads. The cars started the 20-lap race in pairs in numerical order, at 30-second intervals. First away were Szisz and Jörns, but Boillot was the first to arrive back at the finish-line. However, Sailer was ahead on elapsed-time and from the beginning he forced the pace, drawing Boillot into a speed-contest to try and break the Peugeot. On the sixth lap though his Mercedes stopped with engine problems letting Boillot take over the lead. By the 11th lap, just after the halfway mark, Wagner had passed Goux then Lautenschlager to move into second. Szisz had pulled over to replace a wheel, when he was struck by an Opel, that broke his arm.

At the three-quarter mark, Lautenschlager retook second place and started closing on the Peugeot only two and a half minutes ahead. In an epic drive under relentless pressure, Boillot pushed his car to its limit but to no avail. On the eighteenth lap the German took the lead and set about building the gap. Now down to three cylinders, Boillot kept pushing regardless but on the last lap his engine expired leaving Mercedes, after seven hours, to take a crushing 1-2-3 victory with Lautenschlager repeating his 1908 win ahead of Wagner and Salzer. The French crowd was silent, with Goux’s fourth place nearly ten minutes back ahead of Resta’s Sunbeam being scant consolation. With his 25000 franc prizemoney, Lautenschlager was able to build himself a house.

And so it was that perhaps the greatest race of the early period of motor-racing was also the last. Within a month, Europe had descended into total war and racing ceased there for four years. A number of racers served in the war. Georges Boillot was initially the personal driver for Marshal Joffre, but then transferred to the French Air Force (Armée de l'Air) as a fighter pilot. He was killed in a dogfight over Verdun in 1916. Eddie Rickenbacker became the highest scoring ace in the American Air Service. Awarded the Distinguished Service Cross eight times and Medal of Honor (in 1930), he survived the war to take up racing again.

Citations

References
 Cimarosti, Adriano (1997)    The Complete History of Grand Prix Motor Racing    London: Aurum Press Ltd  
 Fox, Charles (1973)    The Great Racing Cars & Drivers    London: Octopus Books Ltd  
 Georgano, Nick (1971)    The Encyclopaedia of Motor Sport    London: Ebury Press Ltd  
 Higham, Peter (1995)    The Guinness Guide to International Motor Racing    London: Guinness Publishing  
 Legate, Trevor (2006)    100 years of Grand Prix    Kent: Touchstone Books Ltd  
 Ludvigsen, Karl (2008)    Racing Colours - Italian Racing Red    Surrey: Ian Allan Publishing Ltd  
 Ludvigsen, Karl (2009)    Racing Colours - German Racing Silver    Surrey: Ian Allan Publishing Ltd  
 Monkhouse, George (1953)    Grand Prix Racing Facts and Figures   London: G.T. Foulis & Co Ltd
 Rendall, Ivan (1991)    The Power and The Glory – A Century of Motor Racing    London: BBC Books  
 Rendall, Ivan (1993)    The Chequered Flag – 100 years of Motor Racing    London: Weidenfeld & Nicolson Ltd  
 Venables, David (2009)    Racing Colours - French Racing Blue    Surrey: Ian Allan Publishing Ltd

External links

  Grand Prix Winners 1895–1949 : Part 1 (1895–1916) – list of the races and winners. Retrieved 28 Aug 2019
  Grand Prix Winners 1895–1949 : History – Hans Etzrodt’s description of the annual regulations, and changes. Retrieved 7 Jun 2019
  GEL Motorsport Information Page  - Darren Galpan’s list of the races, entrants and results. Retrieved 6 Sep 2019
  Motorsport Memorial – motor-racing deaths by year. Retrieved 28 Aug 2019
  La Targa Florio – race report and pictures of the Targa Florio. Retrieved 6 Sep 2019
  Grand Prix History – history of the Targa Florio race. Retrieved 7 Jul 2019
  The Vanderbilt Cup – entrants and results of the Vanderbilt Cup. Retrieved 6 Sep 2019
  MotorSport magazine – race results of AAA championship. Retrieved 28 Aug 2019

Grand Prix seasons
Grand Prix season
 
Grand Prix season